Blake Reid (born and raised in Cremona, Alberta) is a Canadian country music and roots singer-songwriter.  To date he has released 2 albums as a solo artist.

Career

Reid's first album 'Against the Grain' was released independently in 2012. Reid released 'Rust' in 2015, distributed by Sony Music Canada.  In 2017, he formed the 'Blake Reid Band' and is featured in the award-winning full-length film/music documentary 'No Roads In' with respective 'No Roads In' album set to be released 2018. Reid has been touring throughout 2018. Their film and album were created in High River Alberta, Canada (in an old, unused farm house).

Style

Some of Reid's music reflects his Alberta roots, particularly the song 'Fuel, Fertilizer and John Deere'

Discography

Studio albums

Singles

Music videos

Film

References

External links

Canadian country singer-songwriters
Canadian male singer-songwriters
Living people
Musicians from Alberta
Year of birth missing (living people)
21st-century Canadian male singers